The ATX Pro Challenge was a preseason soccer tournament hosted by the Austin Aztex and held in Austin, Texas. The only tournament was won by D.C. United.

Trophy 

The trophy received media attention for its unique character, being an armadillo donning a stetson hat, along with two pistol holsters.

References 

American soccer friendly trophies
Soccer cup competitions in the United States
2014 establishments in Texas